Johnny Be Good is a 1988 American comedy film directed by Bud S. Smith, starring Anthony Michael Hall as the main character, Johnny Walker. The film also features Robert Downey Jr., Paul Gleason, Steve James, Jennifer Tilly and Uma Thurman. Former Chicago Bears quarterback Jim McMahon and sportscaster Howard Cosell make cameo appearances. Despite starring famous actors and comedians, the film was both a critical and financial failure, grossing $18 million. Hall's performance as a jock was panned by critics.

Judas Priest, Saga and Ted Nugent, among others, contributed to the soundtrack. The title track, "Johnny B. Goode", originally recorded by Chuck Berry, was re-recorded by Judas Priest for their album, Ram It Down.

Plot

Johnny Walker, a student at fictitious Ashcroft High School, is the top high school quarterback prospect in the nation, and is being heavily recruited by many schools. His best friend, Leo Wiggins, thinks he should hold out for the best offer while his girlfriend, Georgia, wants him to go to State University with her and get a solid education.

The various colleges offer him everything he could possibly want — hot girls, cars, cash, free room and board, etc. One school even buys Leo a car, while another offers to provide him with male companions if he isn't interested in women. His coach, Wayne Hisler (whom Johnny hates), even tries to sell him out by striking a deal with one of the interested colleges to become their next head coach, if Johnny signs their scholarship offer.

Although he has all the skills a coach would want in a quarterback, Johnny is unsure where he wants to go. Being tempted by the offers, praise, and attention, his ability to make good decisions is blurred. Johnny begins to get a "big head", which irritates his family. After he returns home dressed in a gaudy outfit, his mother reminds him not to forget about what's important. Johnny visits State University, and asks the head coach what he can do for him in order to convince Johnny to sign with State. The coach tells Johnny he will give him a scholarship, a good education, and a chance to earn the starting QB job, and that's all he'll give him. He tells Johnny that he is headed for a lot of trouble if he signs with the colleges that are giving him gifts and money, which is a violation of NCAA rules. Johnny dismisses him out-of-hand.

Later that night, Johnny and Leo end up in a motel room with three girls. Chief Elkans, the local sheriff (and Georgia's strict father, who has a grudge against Johnny), then turns up after the girls falsely accuse them of rape. Coach Hisler visits the two in the local jail, and tells Johnny that either he can sign with Piermont University, the college that hired Hisler, so they can both prosper, or he can end up in prison on the fake charges for a long time, which would jeopardize Johnny's career. While sitting in jail, Johnny discovers that Leo had something to do with his predicament, and is disappointed in him. Nevertheless, Johnny forgives Leo.

On Signing Day, the entire world watches his press conference with anticipation. Coach Hisler then calls the other four top prospects from Johnny's high school team up onto the stage with him and Johnny, where he announces that they will all be at Piermont that next school year, with Hisler as head coach, and Johnny as quarterback. When Johnny has a chance to speak, he talks about the embarrassment and shame he has put on his family, friends and mostly himself. Johnny then decides that he would rather not play than to be treated special just for being able to throw a football, thus also choosing not to sign with Piermont or any schools. The Walker family and Georgia are pleased with Johnny's decision, but Hisler, refusing to accept this as fact, threatens him. When the other four players refuse to sign with Piermont as well, everyone begins to go crazy. Floyd Gondole, the NCAA recruitment investigator comes on stage, and announces that since day one he's been watching the recruitment of Johnny very closely. He then states several of the worst offending colleges will be under investigation for recruiting violations, including Ol' Tex & UCC (the first two colleges Johnny visited), and Piermont, the latter who framed Johnny and Leo for rape. Afterwards, many of the other schools think they still have a chance to sign him, and beg him to reconsider them. The sports agent causes a huge melee, but Johnny walks away with Leo and Georgia.

He is then seen running down a hallway to the office of an unknown Athletic Director. It turns out to be Ned Sanders, the head coach of State University, who accepts Johnny, and officially offers him a scholarship, after he says that he just wants a good education and a chance to play football. After signing with State, he drives off with Georgia and Leo.

Over the credits, you see Johnny playing the drums while watching the collateral damage for all of the people caught in the recruitment scandal (including his former coach, who is in jail).

Cast

Filming

In part, filming took place in Texas including Georgetown, San Antonio, and New Braunfels.  The San Antonio school campuses of Thomas Jefferson High School, Alamo Heights High School and University of the Incarnate Word were used as the backdrop of the film.

Reception
The film was a box office bomb. It also received negative reviews. At review aggregator Rotten Tomatoes, as of August 2022, Johnny Be Good had a 0% rating, based on 18 reviews, with an average score of 3/10. On Metacritic the film has a weighted average score of 10 out of 100, based on 8 critics, indicating "Overwhelming dislike".

Soundtrack

Track listing

Awards and nominations

Nugent's contribution to the soundtrack, "Skintight", earned nomination for a 1988 Golden Raspberry Award as Worst Original Song.

References

External links
 
 
 
 

1988 films
1980s high school films
1980s sports comedy films
1980s teen comedy films
American sports comedy films
American teen comedy films
1980s English-language films
Films shot in San Antonio
Films shot in New Braunfels, Texas
High school football films
Orion Pictures films
1988 comedy films
1980s American films